Penelakut Island, formerly known as Kuper Island and renamed in 2010 in honour of the Penelakut First Nation people, is located in the southern Gulf Islands between Vancouver Island and the mainland Pacific coast of British Columbia, Canada. The island has a population of about 300 members of the Penelakut Band. There is frequent car and passenger ferry service to Penelakut from Chemainus on Vancouver Island. On its west side sits Telegraph Harbour.

A Mediterranean climate of mild winters and warm, dry summers supports a unique ecosystem and an ideal living environment. Unlike most neighbouring Gulf Islands, the topography is subdued with few bluffs or rock outcrops. Poorly drained soils are common.

There is a Roman Catholic Church and a longhouse, but no commercial establishments on the island. Because it is an Indian reserve, property is not available for purchase. (There is one private lot dating from the events of 1863).

From 1890 to 1978, the Catholic Church operated a residential school on the island. The present comprehensive school is run by the Penelakut. There is still much bitterness in the community over the violence and sexual abuse suffered by Indigenous children who attended the school. In 2002, Glenn Doughty, a Catholic Oblate brother who was employed at the school was sentenced to three years in prison for his historical crimes at the Kuper Island School, including indecent assault on a male, gross indecency, and one count of buggery involving 11 different victims. Those were the laws on the books when the crimes occurred in the 1960s and '70s., and former attendees say the abusive practices were widespread. In July 2021, an announcement was made that 160 unmarked graves were identified near the site of the residential school.

History

Britain's Royal Navy, surveying the area in 1851, cruised into a group of five islands in the Strait of Georgia, declaring the colonial name of the two largest islands to be Kuper and Thetis, after their Captain Augustus Leopold Kuper R.N. (1809–1885) and his frigate, HMS Thetis, a 36-gun Royal Navy frigate on the Pacific Station between 1851 and 1853.

In 1861 about 300 Bella Bella Indigenous people in 19 large canoes were ordered away from Victoria by Governor James Douglas. On their return journey north, they staged a surprise attack at dawn on the Penelahut natives of Kuper Island, a tribe of about 400 in number. About 225 Penelahuts were murdered in one of the worse massacres recorded.

A Nanaimo chief named Winni-win-chin was visiting Kuper Island. He escaped to Nanaimo and reported the massacre to Mr. A.G. Horne, in charge of the Hudson's Bay Company post. Mr. Horne dispatched canoe men to Victoria to report the act.

On April 20, 1863, the British gunboat HMS Forward attacked the native village on Kuper Island. The captain believed that the village harboured individuals of the separate Lamalchi tribe involved in two recent assaults in the Gulf Islands in which three Europeans had been killed in combat. The gunboat fired on the village but, unprepared for a naval landing, withdrew with one casualty after a fierce battle with island warriors. Following the event, the colonial government responded with one of the largest military assaults in British Columbia's history, which took place on the east coast of Vancouver Island and extended throughout the waters and islands of Active Pass, Trincomali Channel and Stuart Channel. Subsequently, having gained control of the region, the government publicly hanged four Indigenous men in Victoria and established colonial governance in the region, ultimately forming the Province of British Columbia.

Gallery

References

Islands of the Gulf Islands
First Nations history in British Columbia
Indigenous conflicts in Canada